Pacific Caribbean Cable System (PCCS) is an optical submarine communications cable which connects the United States with several countries of the Caribbean. It was put into operation in September 2015.

The cable runs from Florida to the east coast of Panama, connecting several countries. From the west side of Panama it continues to Ecuador. The cable is 6000 km long and has a bandwidth capacity of 80 Tbit/s.

Landing points 
 Balboa, Panama
 Cartagena, Colombia
 Hudishibana, Aruba
 Jacksonville, United States
 Manta, Ecuador
 Maria Chiquita, Panama
 San Juan, United States
 Tera Corá, Curacao
 Tortola, British Virgin Islands

References 

Submarine communications cables in the Caribbean Sea
Submarine communications cables in the Pacific Ocean
2015 establishments in North America